The Dani–Kwerba languages were a hypothetical language family proposed by Arthur Capell in 1962 and adopted by Stephen Wurm as part of his Trans–New Guinea (TNG) phylum. Malcolm Ross reassigned the Dani languages to a West Trans–New Guinea linkage and the Kwerba languages to his Tor–Kwerba family, outside of TNG altogether.

References

External links
Dani-Kwerba at MultiTree (not functional as of 2014)

Proposed language families
Languages of western New Guinea
Papuan languages
Trans–New Guinea languages